David Reddick (born April 14, 1971, in Anderson, Indiana) is an American artist, illustrator and cartoonist. He is the creator of various popular comic strips such as Legend of Bill, The Trek Life, Gene's Journal and Rod & Barry at Roddenberry.com, and he is a full-time cartoonist at Paws, Inc., where he works on the Garfield worldwide property.

Reddick also worked as an award-winning staff cartoonist at a daily newspaper for 6 years where his editorial cartoons and single-panel cartoons were distributed to newspapers nationwide through Artizans Syndicate, Scripps Howard News Service and CNHI News Service. Reddick also produces comics and cartoons regularly for magazines like Star Trek Magazine, Knights of the Dinner Table, Renaissance Magazine, Nickelodeon and Scholastic's The New York Times Upfront, and has created comic book work for IDW Publishing and Tokyopop, has created product designs for various companies like Paramount Pictures, CBS Studios, Roddenberry Productions, Canson, Inc. and the NCAA, has created mobile content for providers like CBSMobile and ROK Media in the UK, and his abstract and pop art paintings have been exhibited in galleries and museums in Indianapolis, Florida, Michigan, England and France, and he has painted wall murals in Japan. One of Reddick's original paintings and three original cartoons are also included in the permanent collection of the Muskegon Museum of Art.

Reddick began writing The Trek Life in August 2005 as a weekly strip for StarTrek.com. The Trek Life follows three childhood friends who are all Star Trek fans. Reddick's webcomic stopped in December 2007, though Reddick stated that the strip would continue in Star Trek Magazine.

Reddick is also often a guest at Sci-fi, Fantasy, Star Trek and comics conventions nationwide.

References

External links 
 Legend of Bill
 Rod and Barry
 Gene's Journal
 The Trek Life
 Roddenberry.com
 Lightspeed Fine Art
 David Reddick biography at StarTrek.com
 

American comic strip cartoonists
Living people
American illustrators
1971 births
People from Anderson, Indiana
Herron School of Art and Design alumni
Artists from Indiana